Turino Vanni (late 14th century) was an Italian painter.

Biography
He was born at Rigoli, a small village near Pisa.

Works
He was an imitator of Taddeo Bartoli.

 The records show that he worked for the Duomo of Pisa between 1390 and 1395.
 In the church of San Paolo Ripo d'Arno Pisa, is an enthroned Virgin and Child with saints, and adored by four kneeling figures, signed TORINUS VANNIS DE REGULI DEPINXIT A.D. MCCCXCVII.
 He has also left in a convent of Palermo, a S. Madonna with angels and a signed Madonna is found in the Louvre.

Relationships
He is identified as the uncle of Nero and Bernado di Nello (Nello di Vanni), a painter circa 1390, said to be a pupil of Orcagna.

References

14th-century Italian painters
Italian male painters
Painters from Tuscany
Year of death unknown
Year of birth unknown